Limonium cosyrense is a species of flowering plant in the family Plumbaginaceae, native to Malta and Pantelleria. It is occasionally available from commercial suppliers.

References

cosyrense
Flora of Sicily
Plants described in 1891